Saleh Al Jamaan Al-Amri (born 14 October 1993) is a Saudi professional footballer who plays as a winger for Pro League club Abha and the Saudi Arabia national team.

Honours
Al-Ahli
Saudi Crown Prince Cup: 2014–15
Saudi Professional League: 2015–16
King Cup: 2016

References

External links 
 

1993 births
Living people
Saudi Arabian footballers
Saudi Arabia youth international footballers
Saudi Arabia international footballers
Al-Qadsiah FC players
Al-Ahli Saudi FC players
Ettifaq FC players
Al-Wehda Club (Mecca) players
Abha Club players
Saudi First Division League players
Saudi Professional League players
People from Khobar
Association football wingers